Andreas Katz  (born 8 January 1988) is a German cross-country skier who competes internationally.

He represented Germany at the 2018 Winter Olympics.

Cross-country skiing results
All results are sourced from the International Ski Federation (FIS).

Olympic Games

World Championships

World Cup

Season standings

References

External links
 

1988 births
Living people
German male cross-country skiers
Olympic cross-country skiers of Germany
Tour de Ski skiers
Cross-country skiers at the 2018 Winter Olympics
People from Freudenstadt
Sportspeople from Karlsruhe (region)